Rachael Tate is a British sound editor in the film industry. She was nominated for an Academy Award and won a BAFTA Award for Best Sound for her work on the 2019 film 1917.

Career
Tate is a supervising sound editor, with her most recent credits including 'Thirteen Lives', 'The Outfit' and 'Empire of Light'.  She started out as an ADR Recordist at De Lane Lea Studios in London  before going on to edit dialogue and ADR for feature films such as The Martian, Alien: Covenant and Jason Bourne.
Tate won a BAFTA Award for her work on 1917, for which she also received an Academy Award nomination and an MPSE Golden Reel for Best Dialogue & ADR in a Feature Film.  

Rachael is a supporter of Primetime, a vetted visibility platform campaigning for gender equality across every department within the entertainment industry.

Awards and nominations

Academy Awards
 2020: 1917 (Academy Award for Best Sound Editing) - Nominated

BAFTA Awards
 2020: 1917 (BAFTA Award for Best Sound) - Winner

Motion Picture Sound Editors - Golden Reel Awards

 2023: Empire of Light (Best Dialogue and ADR in a Feature Film) - Nominated 
 2022: No Time to Die (Best Dialogue and ADR in a Feature Film) - Nominated 
 2021: News of the World (Best Dialogue and ADR in a Feature Film) - Nominated 
 2020: 1917 (Best Dialogue and ADR in a Feature Film) - Winner
 2020: Battle at Big Rock (Outstanding Achievement in Sound Editing - Sound Effects, Foley, Music, Dialogue and ADR for Live Action Broadcast Media Under 35 Minutes) - Nominated
 2016: The Martian (Best Dialogue and ADR in a Feature Film) - Nominated

AMPS Awards
 2021: News of the World (Excellence in Sound for a Feature Film) - Nominated 
 2020: 1917 (Excellence in Sound for a Feature Film) - Winner

ISFMF Awards
 2020: 1917 (Best Sound Editing) - Winner

Gold Derby Awards
 2020: 1917 (Sound) - Winner
 2020: 1917 (Sound of the Decade) - Nominated

MCFCA Awards
 2020: 1917 (Best Sound) - Winner

ACCA Awards
 2019: 1917 (Best Sound) - Winner

References

External links
 

Year of birth missing (living people)
Living people
Best Sound Editing Academy Award winners
Best Sound BAFTA Award winners
British sound editors
Women sound editors